Al Messila station is a station on the Doha Metro's Green Line. It serves districts on the border between Doha and Al Rayyan, specifically Al Messila, Al Sadd, New Al Hitmi, and Lebday. It is found on Al Rayyan Road in Al Sadd, across the street from Al Sadd's boundary with Al Messila.

The station currently has two metrolinks. Facilities on the premises include restrooms and a prayer room.

History
The station was opened to the public on 10 December 2019 along with the other stations of the Green Line (also known as the Education Line).

Metrolinks
Al Messila station has two metrolinks, which is the Doha Metro's free feeder bus network, servicing the station:

M208, which serves Madinat Khalifa South.
M209, which serves New Al Hitmi and Fereej Bin Omran.

Station Layout

Connections
It is served by bus routes 40, 41, 42, 43, 45, 104 and 104A.

References

Doha Metro stations
2019 establishments in Qatar
Railway stations opened in 2019